Indigenous peoples in Bolivia, or Native Bolivians, are Bolivian people who are of indigenous ancestry. They constitute anywhere from 40 to 70% of Bolivia's population of 11,306,341, depending on different estimates, and belong to 36 recognized ethnic groups. Aymara and Quechua are the largest groups. The geography of Bolivia includes the Andes, the Gran Chaco, and the Amazon Rainforest.

An additional 30-68% of the population is mestizo, having mixed European and indigenous ancestry.

Lands

Lands collectively held by Indigenous Bolivians are Native Community Lands or Tierras Comunitarias de Origen (TCOs). These lands encompass 11 million hectares, and include communities such as Kaa-Iya del Gran Chaco National Park and Integrated Management Natural Area, Isiboro Sécure National Park and Indigenous Territory, Pilón Lajas Biosphere Reserve and Communal Lands, and the Yuki-Ichilo River Native Community Lands.

Rights

In 1991, the Bolivian government signed the Indigenous and Tribal Peoples Convention, 1989, a major binding international convention protecting indigenous rights. On 7 November 2007, the government passed Law No. 3760 which approved of UN Declaration on the Rights of Indigenous Peoples.

In 1993, the Law of Constitutional Reform recognized Indigenous Rights.

Social protests and political mobilization

Revolution: 1952 
Historically Indigenous people in Bolivia suffered many years of marginalization and a lack of representation. However it was in the last decades of the twentieth century that saw a surge of political and social mobilization in Indigenous communities. The 1952 war that liberated Bolivians and gave Indigenous peoples citizenship still gave little to political representation to Indigenous communities. It was in the 1960s and 1970s that social movements such as the Kataraista movement began to also include Indigenous concerns. The Katarista movement, consisting of the Aymara communities, of La Paz and the altiplano, attempted to mobilize the Indigenous community and pursue an Indigenous political identity through mainstream politics and life. Although The Katarista movement failed to create a national political party, the movement influenced many peasant unions such as the Confederacion Sindical de Trabajadores Campesinos de Bolivia (Unitary Syndial Confederation of Peasant Workers in Bolivia). The Katarista movement of the 1970s and 80's died out by the end of the decade however many of the same concerns and issues rose again in the 1990s.

Social movement: 1990s and 2000s 
The 1990s saw a large surge of political mobilization for Indigenous communities. President Sánchez de Lozada passed reforms such as the 1993 Law of Constitutional Reform to acknowledge Indigenous rights in Bolivian culture and society. However, many of these reforms fell short as the government continued to pass destructive environmental and anti-indigenous rules and regulations. A year after the 1993 Law of Constitutional Reform passed recognizing Indigenous Rights, the 1994 Law of Popular Participation decentralized political structures giving municipal and local governments more political autonomy. Two years later the 1996 Electoral Law greater expanded Indigenous political rights as the national congress transitioned into a hybrid proportional system, increasing the number of Indigenous representatives.

Environmental injustice became a polarizing issue as many Indigenous communities protested against government-backed privatization and eradication of natural resources and landscapes. Coca leaf production is an important sector of the Bolivian economy and culture, especially for campesinos and Indigenous peoples. The eradication of coca production, highly supported by the U.S. and its War on Drugs and the Bolivian government spurred heavy protests by the Indigenous community. One of the main leaders of the coca leaf movement, Evo Morales became a vocal opponent against state efforts to eradicate coca. The coca leaf tensions began in the region of Chapare in 2000 and became violent as protests against police officials and residents began. During this time protestors organized road blockades, and traffic stops to protest low prices. Coca leaf producers continued to resist the government's policies on production further devaluing the peso and seized control of  the peasant confederation (Confederation Sindical Unica de Trabajadores Campesinos de Bolivia). With Evo Morales' leadership the cocaceleros were able to form coalitions with other social groups and eventually create a political party, the Movement Towards Socialism (MAS).

Similarly, the 2000 “Water War” bought these protests to national attention. The “Water War" began in the city of Cochabamba where the private company Bechtel began to increase rates for water after the government contracted out to privatize Cochabamba's water system. When Cochabamba's residents realized that they could not afford to pay for this resource, they began to protest in alliance with urban workers, rural peasants and students. The mass protest resulted in a state of emergency as clashes against the police and protestors became more violent. The protests were largely successful and resulted in the reversal of the privatization.

Additionally in 2003, as reliance on natural resources in Bolivia's economy grew, resistance came from Bolivia's Indigenous community in the form of the “Gas Wars”. This conflict which culminated from the Water Wars, united coca farmers, unions and citizens to protest the sale of Bolivia gas reserves to the United States through the port of Chile. Again, Indigenous peoples participated alongside miners, teachers and ordinary citizens through road blockades and the disruption of traffic. Protests politics for social and economic reforms have  been a consistent method for Indigenous mobilization and inclusion in the political process. They have concluded in successful results and created a platform for Indigenous Rights. These protest movements soon made the way for legal and political changes and representation.

Indigenous March in 2011

In 2011 Bolivian indigenous activists started a long protest march from the Amazon plains to the country's capital, against a government plan to build a 306 km highway through a national park in indigenous territory.

The subcentral TIPNIS, the Confederation of Indigenous Peoples of Bolivia (CIDOB), and the highland indigenous confederation CONAMAQ—supported by other indigenous and environmental groups—organized a march from Trinidad, Beni to the national capital La Paz in opposition to the project, beginning on 15 August 2011.

"One of the latest tactics deployed by governments to bypass indigenous contestation is to consult non-native indigenous communities. This happened to communities in the case of the road project through Bolivia’s Isiboro Sécure National Park and Indigenous Territory (TIPNIS)."International pressure built up after Evo Morales’ government violently repressed a large indigenous march against a road project in “the massacre of Chaparina”.

This led to the "Chaparina Massacre" - On September 25, 2011 national police brutally repressed indigenous marchers protesting the construction of a government-proposed highway through the TIPNIS indigenous territory and national park.

Evo Morales and the plurinational state 
One of the biggest successes for Bolivia's indigenous community was the election of Evo Morales, former leader of the cocaleros and Bolivia's first indigenous President. President Evo Morales  attempted to establish a plurinational and postcolonial state to expand the collective rights of the indigenous community. The 2009 constitution recognized the presence of the different communities that reside in Bolivia and gave indigenous peoples the right of self governance and autonomy over their ancestral territories. Expanding on the Constitution, the 2010 Framework Law of Autonomies and Decentralization outlined the legal rules and procedures that indigenous communities must take to receive autonomy. Through these decentralization efforts Bolivia became the first plurinational state in South America. However many indigenous communities claim that the process to receive autonomy is inefficient and lengthy. Along with indigenous concerns, there are internal issues and competing interests between Bolivia's restrictive legal framework, liberal policies and the concept of indigenous self-governance. Nonetheless the addition of subautonomies in Bolivia's government has made strides in including indigenous communities in the political process.

Achievements 
In 2015 Bolivians made history again by selecting the first Indigenous President of the Supreme Court of Justice, Justice Pastor Cristina Mamani. Justice Mamani is a lawyer from the Bolivian highlands from the Aymara community. She won the election with the most votes. The Supreme Court of Justice is made up of nine members and nine alternative justices, each representing the nine departments in Bolivia. The justices are elected in popular nonpartisan elections with terms of six years.

Groups

Precolumbian cultures

 Tiwanaku, 300–1000 AD
 Mollo culture, 1000–1500 AD
 Lupaca
 Charca people
 Payaguá people
 Uru-Murato

Contemporary groups

 Araona (Cavina)
 Aymara, Andes
 Ayoreo, Gran Chaco
 Baure, Beni Department
 Borôro, Santa Cruz Department
 Callawalla, Andes
 Canichana (Kanichana), lowlands
 Cavineños, northern Bolivia
 Cayubaba (Cayuvava, Cayuwaba), Beni Department
 Chácobo, northwest Beni Department
 Chané (Izoceño), Santa Cruz Department
 Chipaya (Puquina), Oruro Department
 Chiquitano (Chiquito, Tarapecosi), Santa Cruz Department
 Ese Ejja (Ese Exa, Huarayo, Tiatinagua), northwest Bolivia
 Guaraní, Eastern Bolivian Guarani or Chiriguano
 Guarayu
 Guató
 Ignaciano (Moxo), Beni
 Itene (Iteneo, Itenez), Beni
 Itonama (Machoto, Saramo)
 Kolla
 Jorá (Hora)
 Leco (Rik’a), east Lake Titicaca
 Machinere (Maxinéri), Pando Department
 Movima, Beni
 Nivaclé, Ashlushlay, Axluslay, Chulupí, Gran Chaco
 Pacahuara (Pacawara), Beni
 Paunaka (Pauna), Ñuflo de Suarez
 Pauserna (Guarayu-Ta, Paucerne, Pauserna-Guarasugwé), Beni
 Quechua (Kichua), Bolivia
 Reyesano (Maropa, San Borjano), Beni
 Saraveca, Santa Cruz
 Shinabo (Mbia Chee, Mbya)
 Sirionó (Miá), Beni and Santa Cruz
 Tacana (Takana), La Paz Department
 Tapieté (Guasurango, Ñanagua, Tirumbae, Yanaigua), Tarija Department
 Toba (Qom), Tarija Department
 Toromona (Toromono), La Paz Department
 Trinitario (Mojos, Moxos), Beni
 Tsimané (Chimané, Mosetén), Beni
 Uru (Iru-Itu, Morato, Muratu), Oruro Department
 Wichí (Noctén, Noctenes, Oktenai, Weenhayek), Tarija Department
 Yaminawá (Jaminawa, Yamanawa, Yaminahua), Pando Department
 Yuqui (Bia, Yuki)
 Yuracare (Yura), Beni and Cochabamba Departments

See also

 Demographics of Bolivia
 Mestizos in Bolivia
 White Bolivians
 Confederation of Indigenous Peoples of Bolivia
 Andean music
 Andean textiles
 Ekeko, Andean god of abundance
 El Fuerte de Samaipata, archeological site
 Guarani mythology
 History of Bolivian nationality
 Kallawaya, traditional healers
 Yanantin, complementary dualism in Andean philosophy

Bibliography 
 Ideología mesiánica del mundo andino, Juan M. Ossio Acuña, Edición de Ignacio Prado Pastor

Notes 

 
Bolivia
 
Ethnic groups in Bolivia
Indigenous peoples of the Amazon
Indigenous peoples of the Andes
Indigenous peoples of the Gran Chaco